The swimming competition at the 1987 Summer Universiade took place in Zagreb, Yugoslavia from July 9 to July 14, 1987.

Men's events

Legend:

Women's events

Legend:

References
Medalist Summary (Men) on GBRATHLETICS.com
Medalist Summary (Women) on GBRATHLETICS.com

1987 in swimming
Swimming at the Summer Universiade
1987 Summer Universiade